Killilea is a surname originating in Ireland. Among those with the name are:

 Gayle Killilea Irish socialite
 Henry Killilea  (1863–1929),  American baseball team owner and attorney
 Karen Killilea (1940-2020), Marie Killilea's daughter with cerebral palsy
 Marie Killilea (1913–91), American author and cerebral palsy activist 
 Mark Killilea Snr (1896–1970), Irish Fianna Fáil Party politician
 Mark Killilea Jnr (1939-2018), Irish Fianna Fáil Party politician
 Matthew Killilea  (1862–1902), American lawyer and politician